Mohammed Salim (born 5 June 1957) is an Indian Communist politician, belonging to the Communist Party of India (Marxist). He was inducted in the politburo of CPI(M) in the 21st party congress organised at Visakhapatnam in 2015. He was  a member of the 16th Lok Sabha, representing Raiganj constituency. Earlier, he was a member of the 14th Lok Sabha, representing the Calcutta North East constituency of West Bengal. After delimitation, in the 2009 Lok Sabha election Salim contested the new Calcutta North constituency, and lost to Sudip Bandyopadhyay of the Trinamool Congress.

Early life 
Born on 5 June 1957 in the Kidderpore area of South Kolkata to Azizul Haque, an employee of Kolkata Port, and Ladly Haque, Salim was one of nine siblings. He did his schooling from St. Barnabas High School, Calcutta. Afterwards he studied Humanities. During this time, he was saved from drowning in a village in Uluberia by a woman, with whose family he still maintains contact.

Political career 
He joined Maulana Azad College to study philosophy. During his college days, he became a part of the contemporary student's movement in West Bengal and became an active member of the Students' Federation of India. He was elected general secretary of the students' union of his college immediately after re-imposition of democracy post the Indian Emergency. He has stated that the Emergency was the most influential event in his life, which made him opt for politics.

After passing out from Maulana Azad College, he enrolled in Jadavpur University to obtain his master's degree in philosophy. During his days of student activism in Jadavpur, he met up with his future colleagues at CPI(M) Nilotpal Basu and Manab Mukherjee. He served as the President of Kolkata district committee of Democratic Youth Federation of India (D.Y.F.I.) during 1983-1989.

He also served as the general secretary of DYFI from 1991 to 2001. He was elected to the Rajya Sabha from West Bengal in 1990 and served two terms till 2001.

In the West Bengal assembly elections held in 2001, he was elected from the Entally. He served as the Minister for Technical Education and Training, Youth Welfare, Minority Development and Welfare, Self Employment till 2004.

In the 14th General Elections held in 2004, he won from the Calcutta North East constituency of West Bengal and served as the deputy leader of the  CPI(M) Lok Sabha group. After delimitation, in the 2009 Lok Sabha election Salim contested the new Calcutta North constituency, and lost to Sudip Bandyopadhyay of the Trinamool Congress.

He was a member of the 16th Lok Sabha, representing Raiganj constituency. In 2019 Indian general election he again contested from Raiganj but lost against Debasree Chaudhuri of Bharatiya Janata Party and lost his security deposit after coming third. He also served as the deputy leader of the CPI(M) Lok Sabha group between 2004 and 2009 and again between 2014 and 2019. He also contested from the Chanditala Vidhan Sabha Constituency in the 2021 West Bengal Assembly elections, but lost to actor Swati Khandoker of  TMC.

He was also elected to the Central Committee of the Communist Party of India (Marxist) in 1998. 
He was later inducted in the state committee and state secretariat in 2006. He was elected to the politburo of C.P.I.(M.) in the 21st party congress organised at Visakhapatnam in 2015.

In 2022, he was elected as Secretary of West Bengal state committee of CPI(M). He has led efforts to rejuvenate the party in West Bengal after it was routed in the 2021 West Bengal Legislative Assembly election.

References 

Living people
1957 births
21st-century Indian Muslims
Communist Party of India (Marxist) politicians from West Bengal
India MPs 2004–2009
Politicians from Kolkata
Maulana Azad College alumni
University of Calcutta alumni
India MPs 2014–2019
Lok Sabha members from West Bengal
People from Uttar Dinajpur district
20th-century Bengalis
21st-century Bengalis
DYFI All India Presidents